The canton of Arras-2 is an administrative division of the Pas-de-Calais department, in northern France. It was created at the French canton reorganisation which came into effect in March 2015. Its seat is in Arras.

It consists of the following communes: 

Arras (partly)
Athies 
Bailleul-Sir-Berthoult
Fampoux
Farbus
Feuchy
Gavrelle
Monchy-le-Preux
Saint-Laurent-Blangy
Saint-Nicolas
Thélus
Willerval

References

Cantons of Pas-de-Calais